New Country Hits is an album by American country music artist George Jones. It was released in 1965 on the Musicor Records label.

Background
New Country Hits features Jones's first studio recording of "Take Me", a song he co-wrote with Leon Payne and would record more famously with Tammy Wynette.  The album also includes the hits "Love Bug" (inspired by Buck Owens and the Bakersfield sound) and the self-pitying "Things Have Gone To Pieces".  Although he stuck to country music with a vengeance, Jones did his best to record a wide range of songs under the country umbrella, stating in the 1989 documentary Same Ole Me, "I've always tried to be versatile.  I've always tried to do up-tempos and novelties and ballads."   The album is also noteworthy for its cover, which features the singer's backing band the Jones Boys.  Like Buck Owens' Buckaroos and Merle Haggard's Strangers, Jones worked with many musicians who were great talents in their own right, including Johnny Paycheck, who played bass and sang harmony with Jones before going on to his own stardom in the 1970s.  Paycheck is seated next to Jones on the cover of the album.

Reception
Upon release, New Country Hits rose to number 5 on the country music album chart.  Critic Eugene Chadbourne of AllMusic writes that "the slightly strained, bluegrass-influenced high-end vocals are here, along with overwhelming dips into the baritone end and phrasing that rivals that of jazz singer Billie Holiday's" and adds that "the musicians sound wonderful here, creating a sentimental old-time country sound when necessary in the devastating "I'm Wasting Good Paper" or delivering the type of twangy honky-tonk country fans associate with Bakersfield..."

Track listing
"Love Bug" (Wayne Kemp, Curtis Wayne) – 2:03
"Til I Hear from You" (Jones, Jack Ripley) – 2:26
"I Made Her That Way" (Jones, Dale Ward) – 2:24
"I'm Wasting Good Paper" (Earl Montgomery) – 2:29
"Along Came You" (Jones, Kemp, Jack Rich) – 2:30
"I'd Rather Switch Than Fight" (Kemp) – 2:05
"Things Have Gone to Pieces" (Leon Payne) – 2:52
"If You Won't Tell on Me" (Dallas Frazier) – 2:35
"Memory is a Flower" (Jones, Jimmy Day) – 2:59
"Feeling Single, Seeing Double" (Kemp) – 2:07
"We're Watching Our Step" (E. Montgomery, Melba Montgomery) – 2:58
"Take Me" (Jones, Payne) – 2:40

External links
George Jones' Official Website

1965 albums
George Jones albums
Albums produced by Pappy Daily
Musicor Records albums